Aberffrwd is a village in the Welsh principal area of Ceredigion. It has a railway station on the narrow-gauge Vale of Rheidol Railway, which was operated by British Rail as part of the island wide rail network until 1980.

Villages in Ceredigion